María la del Barrio (Lit: Maria from the neighborhood/English title: Humble Maria) is a Mexican telenovela produced by Angelli Nesma Medina for Televisa in 1995. The series is a remake of Los ricos también lloran. María la del Barrio is considered one of the world's most popular and successful shows ever, having been broadcast in over 180 countries. It is the last part of the Trilogía de las Marías.

The series stars Thalía, Fernando Colunga and Itatí Cantoral.

Plot

María Hernández is a young, humble, uneducated dreamer, who lives with her godmother Cacilda on the outskirts of Mexico City and works as a picker of recyclable material in a landfill. On the day that María turns 15, her godmother dies, who on her deathbed, asks Father Honorio to find a place where her goddaughter can work and live. Maria is welcomed by businessman Fernando De la Vega, one of the most influential and richest men in the country. He teaches María manners and welcomes her as a family member, although his wife Victoria and Carlota, one of the household's maids, despise María upon meeting her.

Luis Fernando, the eldest son of the De la Vega family, is dumped by his girlfriend Brenda, and swears not to become involved emotionally with women, but to toy with them. He initially engages with María for this purpose, but ends up falling in love with her. Soraya Montenegro, the boastful and proud niece of Victoria, is in love with Luis Fernando and wants to marry him. She despises María and calls her "marginal".

María is slowly gaining the friendship and confidence of the residents and employees of the mansion, including Victoria, who changes her attitude towards María, Lupe, the housekeeper, and Vladimir and Vanessa, the younger children of the De la Vega family. Soraya takes advantage of a drunk Luis Fernando, takes him to bed and brings a fake pregnancy test, which forces him to marry her, even though he loves María. In order to forget Luis Fernando, María starts dating Vladimir. She also starts taking etiquette classes from Doña Caro, a teacher hired especially by Don Fernando to teach María. Luis Fernando also undergoes a personality transformation: he becomes more mature and stops drinking and starts working in his father's company. He starts to suspect Soraya is not pregnant, so she brings another pregnancy test. Soraya now claims that she suffered a miscarriage.

Soraya, who goes to live in the mansion of the De la Vega's with her nanny Calixta, who has taken care of her since she was a child, constantly fights with María and wants to kill her. Calixta, who is also a healer, helps her put poisonous weeds in María's water. María gets sick and is sent to the hospital, where she discovers the cause of the disease. Calixta reveals to Soraya that she is her real mother. Hateful, Soraya kicks her out of the mansion. Osvaldo, Soraya's lover, discovers the evil plan and threatens her; if she did not give him money, he would tell. In a violent fight, Soraya tries to kill him and ends up falling from the window of an apartment and is presumed dead. Soon Luis Fernando and Maria plan to get married, but a jealous Vladimir chooses not to attend the wedding.

During their marriage, Luis Fernando starts to suspect that María and his brother are lovers. When Vladimir goes to the mansion to apologize to María for not having appeared at her wedding, Luis Fernando sees them embracing. This incident creates a misunderstanding, and he distances himself from his brother and his wife. Meanwhile, the rest of the De la Vega family moves temporarily to Spain, leaving María alone in the house. She becomes pregnant and finds support and friendship in Lupe, the housekeeper. Unfortunately, during her pregnancy, she is plagued with bipolar disorder and fever. Moments before having the baby, Luis Fernando files for divorce from María, who desperately leaves the mansion. María then gives birth to her son in a hospital and names him Fernando. She is discharged with the baby and wanders mentally unbalanced in the streets with the baby in her arms. Unintentionally, she gives him to a woman by the name Agripina.

Luis Fernando finds María in a mental hospital, and is told that their son died. Unsure of what to do, Luis Fernando adopts a baby girl named María de los Ángeles, nicknamed 'Tita' (Veronica's biological daughter). María decides to search for her lost son and leaves Luis Fernando with Tita almost every day. Simultaneously, Lupe hires Penélope, her goddaughter, to take care of Tita. Penélope, however, is sly and deceitful. She falls in love with Luis Fernando and they become lovers. María eventually discovers the truth and fires Penélope and files for a divorce from Luis Fernando. However, he apologizes to María and she accepts.

Fifteen years pass, and Fernando (Nando), now fifteen years old, works as a lottery vendor. One night, Agripina has an accident and is admitted to a hospital. In order to buy medicine for his mother, Nando is convinced by a friend to steal money from a rich house. Unknowingly, he robs the house of María and is caught by her and Luis Fernando, who arrives and points a gun at him. Nando goes on to explain that he was stealing because he needed the money to buy medicine for his mother, who is in the hospital due to an accident. Luis Fernando refuses to believe him, and takes the boy to the police station, following his arrest. María pleads with her husband to let Nando free, after which he reluctantly accepts. She later returns to the hospital and recognizes Agripina, who, on the other hand, does not remember her. She says she is very worried about Nando, so María says that she hired him to work in her house.

María begins to support her son, all the while hiding the truth from him. Tita, now fifteen, thinks Nando is her mother's lover, and tries hard to find ways to expose them. Penélope is now married to José María Cano "Papacito", a good-for-nothing rascal. The two coincidentally live in the same apartment as Nando, and blackmail María that they will tell Tita that she was adopted and that Nando is her lover to everyone, if she doesn't give them money in exchange for silence. Maria is finally fed up with Tita's constant misconceptions and reveals to her that Nando is her lost son.

After María tells Nando that he is her son, he comes to live with the De la Vega family. Luis Fernando, still unaware that he is his son, believes that María took her lover into his own home and grabs his gun and attempts to kill him. After the bullet is released from his gun, María screams that Nando is their son. She consequently makes up with her husband and reunites Nando with his father. Penélope and José María are arrested for their crimes.

Soraya fully recovers from her accident fourteen years prior and lives in Houston, Texas, United States. She marries the widowed billionaire Oscar Montalbán, whose seventeen-year-old daughter Alicia is disabled. She murders him and inherits all his wealth, but has to take care of Alicia. Soraya returns to Mexico, ready to get revenge on María and the De la Vega family. At first, she shows remorse for everything she did, trying to convince the family. She meets and seduces Nando, affects him in a bad way and incites him against his parents.

Nando starts visiting Soraya's mansion just to get drunk and serve as a sexual object. In the mansion, Nando meets Alicia and her governess Esperanza, who advise him to stop coming and go home. María suspects that Soraya has not changed and is just using Nando. Nando finds Soraya kissing with a man called Aldo and leaves her. Soraya gets depressed and realizes that her former lover is now in love with Alicia and forbids her to see him.

In an attempt to reconcile with Nando, Soraya arranges a party and invites him. Nando goes to see Alicia and Soraya, who has a crisis of psychopathy, beats her, hits Esperanza against the wall and cuts Nando with a pair of scissors. Alicia is saved by Aldo, and Nando goes to a hospital, where he is admitted. María reported Soraya but she pretends to be innocent. With the idea of revenge, Soraya finds her mother, Calixta. Calixta, too poor and ill, lives as a beggar, and recognizes her daughter. Feeling hatred towards her own mother, she pushes Calixta, who hits her head and dies.

Initially, Nando is accused of the crime, but María takes the blame and is convicted and imprisoned in a women's jail, where she meets with Penélope. While in prison, Maria is humiliated and assaulted by inmates and Rosenda, one of the prison guards. A big fire happens after Rosenda was fired for assaulting Gracia. María saves Penélope but disappears in the flames. Maria is now presumed dead. Penélope, after being saved by María, regrets all the wrong she has done and decides to pursue a new life after being released from jail. Days later, Dr. Daniel Ordóñez finds María wandering the streets without memory and takes her home, where she works as a nanny for his two children.

Cecilia, who is in love with Daniel, confronts María. After finding out she was poisoning his daughter to blame María, Daniel throws Cecilia out of the house. After weeks working in Daniel's house, the director of the prison informs that María is alive and possibly without memory.

Nando and his father get excited and decide to seek her through the streets, but Agripina has a heart attack and they take her to the hospital, where they are reunited with María. After it was revealed that she killed Oscar Montalbán and Dr. Mejia, Soraya flees from the police, encounters María and creates a plan to kill her. She disguises herself as a nurse and tells her that she is a friend of the De la Vega family and that Tita is ill and takes her to her cabin. Esperanza and Alicia observe and contact the De la Vega family.

Agripina survives her heart attack. In the cabin, Soraya pushes María during a fight, against a wall of a fireplace. Upon awaking, she remembers everything and a tearful Soraya confesses her crimes, going completely insane. With a pistol in hand, Soraya throws petrol around the cabin. Meanwhile, Soraya's maid reveals where Soraya is, and Luis Fernando and the police go to the cabin. Soraya, rather preferring death over going back to jail, throws a lit match on the ground, setting the cabin alight.

Luis Fernando saves María, who tries to save Soraya, who herself is trapped in the flames and burns to death. Two months later, Luis Fernando and María celebrate a happy new life with their children. Gracia, María's friend from prison, is now working as the nanny to Daniel's children. Urbano and Fellipa get together, while Agripina marries Veracruz. Nando dates Alicia, who undergoes surgery and is able to walk, and Tita dates Aldo. María reveals she is pregnant again.

Cast

Extended cast

Awards

Remake 

In 2011 ABS-CBN announced that Televisa had given them the permit to do a Philippine version of the series. The Philippine remake stars Erich Gonzales as the titular character with Enchong Dee as her leading man.

References

External links

1995 telenovelas
Mexican telenovelas
1995 Mexican television series debuts
1996 Mexican television series endings
Spanish-language telenovelas
Television shows set in Mexico City
Televisa telenovelas